Orford is a provincial electoral district in the Estrie region of Quebec, Canada that elects members to the National Assembly of Quebec. It notably includes the municipalities of Magog, Orford, Stanstead and Sainte-Catherine-de-Hatley.

It was created for the 1973 election from parts of the Shefford, Sherbrooke and Stanstead electoral districts.

In the change from the 2001 to the 2011 electoral map, it lost the part of western Sherbrooke that it formerly had to the Richmond electoral district and the municipalities of Barnston-Ouest and Stanstead-Est to the Saint-François electoral district.  However, it gained a number of municipalities from Brome-Missisquoi.

Members of the National Assembly

Election results

^ Change is from redistributed results. CAQ change is from ADQ.

References

External links
Information
 Elections Quebec

Election results
 Election results (National Assembly)
 Election results (QuébecPolitique)

Maps
 2011 map (PDF)
 2001 map (Flash)
2001–2011 changes (Flash)
1992–2001 changes (Flash)
 Electoral map of Estrie region
 Quebec electoral map, 2011

Orford
Magog, Quebec
Stanstead, Quebec